Cory Morgan (born August 20, 1978) is a Canadian former professional ice hockey player.

Career 
Morgan played major junior hockey in the Western Hockey League with the Prince Albert Raiders before making his professional hockey debut during the 1999–2000 season with the Tacoma Sabercats of the West Coast Hockey League.

Morgan played his final three seasons in the British Elite leagues, winning the 2004–2005 British National League title with the Dundee Stars, and the 2005–06 Elite Ice Hockey League Playoff Championships with the Newcastle Vipers.

References

External links

1978 births
Living people
Canadian ice hockey right wingers
Dayton Bombers players
Dundee Stars players
Houston Aeros (1994–2013) players
Ice hockey people from Alberta
Idaho Steelheads (WCHL) players
Newcastle Vipers players
Prince Albert Raiders players
Syracuse Crunch players
Tacoma Sabercats players
Texas Wildcatters players
Canadian expatriate ice hockey players in England
Canadian expatriate ice hockey players in Scotland
Canadian expatriate ice hockey players in the United States
Canadian expatriate ice hockey players in Sweden